Viktor Vasilievich Nikiforov (December 4, 1931 – March 4, 1989) was a Soviet ice hockey player. He won a gold medal at the 1956 Winter Olympics. He was born in Moscow, Soviet Union.

References

External links

Biography of Viktor Nikiforov 

1931 births
1989 deaths
Ice hockey players at the 1956 Winter Olympics
Ice hockey people from Moscow
Medalists at the 1956 Winter Olympics
Olympic gold medalists for the Soviet Union
Olympic ice hockey players of the Soviet Union
Olympic medalists in ice hockey
Soviet ice hockey forwards
Russian ice hockey forwards